Open water swimming at the 2019 World Aquatics Championships was held from 13 to 19 July 2019.

Schedule
Seven events were held.

All times are local (UTC+9).

Medal summary

Medal table

Men

Women

Team

References

External links
Official website

 
Open water swimming
Open water swimming at the World Aquatics Championships
Open water swimming at the World Aquatics Championships
Swimming competitions in South Korea